Rodrigo dos Santos de Freitas (born 17 June 1998), known as Rodrigo Freitas or just Rodrigo, is a Brazilian professional footballer who plays as a centre-back for Chapecoense.

Club career

São Paulo
Rodrigo joined São Paulo's youth ranks at age 14. Between 2017 and 2018, he was the captain of the under-20 squad. In 2018, after his 20th anniversary, he was promoted to the first team.

Rodrigo made his first team debut for Tricolor on 3 February 2019, starting in a 1–0 Campeonato Paulista home win over São Bento.

Loan to Portimonense
On 25 June 2019, Rodrigo joined Primeira Liga club Portimonense on loan. He made his debut for the club on 19 August 2019 during a 2-1 league win over C.D. Tondela.

Rodrigo featured in eight league matches for the side before returning in July 2020.

Return from loan
Rodrigo was included in the first team squad after his loan ended, but only started to feature again for the first in 2021. He scored his first goal for São Paulo on 25 April 2021, netting the opener in a 3–0 away win over Ituano.

Rodrigo left the club in December 2021, as his contract expired.

Avaí
On 8 April 2022, free agent Rodrigo signed a contract with Avaí also in the Série A, until the end of the year.

Honours
São Paulo
Campeonato Paulista: 2021

References

External links
 

1998 births
Living people
Sportspeople from Salvador, Bahia
Brazilian footballers
Association football defenders
Campeonato Brasileiro Série A players
São Paulo FC players
Avaí FC players
Primeira Liga players
Portimonense S.C. players
Brazilian expatriate footballers
Brazilian expatriate sportspeople in Portugal
Expatriate footballers in Portugal